Ziri Hammar (born July 25, 1992 in Akbou) is an Algerian football player. He currently players for US Biskra in the Algerian Ligue Professionnelle 1. He plays as an attacking midfielder and can play on both sides of the field.

Club career
On February 12, 2011, Hammar made his professional debut for AS Nancy in a Ligue 1 game against AJ Auxerre. Hammar started the game on the bench and came on as a substitute in the 89th minute in place of Alexandre Cuvillier, as Nancy went on to win 3-1.

Before the 2013-2014 Süper Lig season, Hammar moved to Kayseri Erciyesspor. He played his first match for his new team in a Turkish Cup meeting against Edirnespor.

International career
Hammar was a member of the Algerian Under-17 National Team at the 2009 FIFA U-17 World Cup in Nigeria. He played in all three of Algeria's group stage games at the World Cup, coming on as a substitute in the first two and starting the final one against South Korea. However, Algeria lost all three games and failed to progress to the second round.

On March 24, 2010, Hammar was called up to the Algerian Under-20 National Team for the 2010 UNAF U-20 Tournament in Algeria.

Honours

Club
 USM Alger
 Algerian Super Cup (1): 2016

References

External links

 
 
 

1992 births
Living people
People from Akbou
Kabyle people
Algerian footballers
Ligue 1 players
AS Nancy Lorraine players
JS Saoura players
MC Oran players
Kayseri Erciyesspor footballers
Algerian expatriate footballers
Algerian expatriate sportspeople in France
Algerian expatriate sportspeople in Turkey
Expatriate footballers in France
Expatriate footballers in Turkey
Algeria youth international footballers
Association football midfielders
21st-century Algerian people